Mostafa Ali Matar (born 10 September 1995) is a Lebanese footballer who plays as a goalkeeper for Saudi club Al-Orobah, on loan from  club Ahed, and the Lebanon national team.

Matar began his senior career in 2015 with Salam Zgharta in the Lebanese Premier League. In summer 2020, he joined league champions Ahed for a national-record fee of LBP 525 million, and was promptly moved to Tripoli on a one-year loan. Matar returned to Ahed in 2021 and was their first-choice goalkeeper in their 2021–22 league title win. In summer 2022, he moved to Saudi side Al-Orobah on loan.

Having represented Lebanon internationally at under-23 level, Matar was called up for the senior team to the 2019 AFC Asian Cup. He made his senior debut at the 2019 WAFF Championship, and participated in the qualifications for the 2022 FIFA World Cup.

Club career 

Following five years at Salam Zgharta, Matar joined AFC Cup champions Ahed on 2 July 2020, on a five-year deal for £L525 million (around $333,000). The fee was the highest ever paid by a Lebanese club. He joined Tripoli on a one-year loan on 29 September 2020. He returned from the loan on 5 May 2021, and was Ahed's main goalkeeper in their 2021–22 league title win, conceding only six goals in 19 games.

On 21 June 2022, Matar moved to Al-Orobah in the Saudi First Division League on a 10-month loan.

International career

2017–2019: Early career 
Matar played for the Lebanon national under-23 team at the 2018 AFC U-23 Championship qualification, and was their captain on one occasion.

In December 2018, Matar was called up for the 2019 AFC Asian Cup squad for the senior team. His debut came on 8 August 2019, against Yemen at the 2019 WAFF Championship.

2021–present: Breakthrough 
Having been called-up as Lebanon's third-choice keeper, Matar played as a starter in the third round of qualification for the 2022 FIFA World Cup, following Mehdi Khalil's ACL injury and Ali Daher resulting positive to COVID-19. He kept a clean sheet in a 0–0 draw against the United Arab Emirates in the opening game, and was nominated Man of the Match.

Matar continued playing as a starter for Lebanon at the 2021 FIFA Arab Cup in December 2021 where, despite having conceded three goals to Egypt and Algeria, he was praised for his performances.

Style of play 
A good shot-stopper, Matar is a quick and agile goalkeeper with good positioning and handling.

Career statistics

International

Honours 
Ahed
 Lebanese Premier League: 2021–22
 Lebanese Elite Cup runner-up: 2021

Individual
 Lebanese Premier League Team of the Season: 2016–17

References

External links 

 
 
 
 
 

1995 births
Living people
People from North Governorate
Lebanese footballers
Association football goalkeepers
Salam Zgharta FC players
Al Ahed FC players
AC Tripoli players
Al-Orobah FC players
Lebanese Premier League players
Saudi First Division League players
Lebanon youth international footballers
Lebanon international footballers
2019 AFC Asian Cup players
Lebanese expatriate footballers
Lebanese expatriate sportspeople in Saudi Arabia
Expatriate footballers in Saudi Arabia